Contraband is the fourth studio album by the Norwegian urban music duo Madcon. It was released on 17 November 2010. It peaked at number two on the Norwegian Albums Chart, becoming the group's highest-charting album. The album was preceded by the Element-produced lead single, "Glow" which became a top 20-hit in nine countries.

Singles
 "Glow" was released on 30 May 2010 as the first single from the album. It peaked at number one in Norway. Madcon performed the song during the Eurovision Song Contest 2010 Grand Final interval in Oslo, Norway.
 "Freaky Like Me" was released on 20 September 2010. It features the Belgian singer Ameerah. The song peaked at number one in Norway, becoming the group's third number-one single. It also reached number forty-six in the United Kingdom.
 "Outrun the Sun" was released on 19 November 2010. It features the American singer Maad*Moiselle. The song peaked at number eleven in Norway and at number twenty-seven in Germany.
 "Helluva Nite" was releasedon 7 September 2011. It features the American singer Maad*Moiselle. Even though Ludacris is featured on the album, Madcon decided not to put him in the single. For the release in Germany a part of the singer/rapper Itchy from the German band Culcha Candela was added instead.

Track listing

Charts

Release history

References

2010 albums
Madcon albums
Albums produced by Stargate